Reinalda van Eymeren (1463–1540) was a religious sister in St Agnes Convent, Arnhem who has been proposed as the author of the highly influential, anonymous Middle Dutch spiritual text Die Evangelische Peerle (The Pearl of the Gospel), first published in 1535, and  (Of the Temple of Our Soul), first published 1543.

Reinalda was born in Arnhem in 1463, the daughter of Wichman van Eymeren and his wife Andrea. Her father was an alderman in the city government. She spent most of her life as a sister in the Convent of St Agnes, where she was remarked for her total abstinence from fish and meat, her frequent communion, and her musical talents. She died on 28 January 1540 and was buried in the church of the Brethren of the Common Life in Arnhem, demolished in 1805.

In 1987 an imagined portrait of her was installed in the "gallery of honour" in the Cathedral of St Bavo, Haarlem.

Her authorship of Die Evangelische Peerle is not generally accepted, and some have even questioned her existence.

References

1463 births
1540 deaths
15th-century Christian nuns
People from Arnhem
Nuns of the Habsburg Netherlands